Attias may refer to:

Cécilia Attias (born 1957), second wife of French President Nicolas Sarkozy until October 2007
Dan Attias (born 1951), American television director and producer
Emilia Attias (born 1987), Argentine actress, dancer, model and TV host
Richard Attias (born 1959), Moroccan events producer, founder and former chairman of PublicisLive and the executive chairman of Richard Attias and Associates
Yitzhak Attias (born 1958), Gibraltar-born Israeli musician
Ziggy Attias (born 1966), Israeli-American artist, entrepreneur, founder and director of the Château d'Orquevaux Artist Residency in France

See also
Attia
Atia (disambiguation)
Atias
Atiyah